Davor Mizerit (born 4 January 1981) is a rower from Slovenia, who competed for his native country at the 2004 Summer Olympics in Athens, Greece.

He won the bronze medal in the Men's Single Sculls event at the 2005 Mediterranean Games in Almería, Spain.

He was born in Koper and is a member of the Veslaski Klub Nautilus Koper.

References

External links 
 
 
 
 

1981 births
Living people
Slovenian male rowers
Olympic rowers of Slovenia
Rowers at the 2004 Summer Olympics
Sportspeople from Koper
World Rowing Championships medalists for Slovenia
Mediterranean Games bronze medalists for Slovenia
Mediterranean Games medalists in rowing
Competitors at the 2005 Mediterranean Games
21st-century Slovenian people